Nick Smith (born March 23, 1979) is a former professional ice hockey center who played in the National Hockey League from Hamilton, Ontario. He played for the Florida Panthers during the 2001–02 season. He was selected by the Panthers during the 1997 NHL Entry Draft, in the 3rd round (74th overall).

Career statistics

External links

1979 births
Living people
Barrie Colts players
Bridgeport Sound Tigers players
SC Bietigheim-Bissingen players
Canadian ice hockey centres
Cincinnati Mighty Ducks players
Florida Panthers draft picks
Florida Panthers players
Ice hockey people from Ontario
Louisville Panthers players
Port Huron Border Cats players
Sportspeople from Hamilton, Ontario
Saint John Flames players
Trondheim Black Panthers players
Canadian expatriate ice hockey players in Norway